FHI 360 (formerly Family Health International) is a nonprofit human development organization based in North Carolina. FHI 360 operates in more than 70 countries and all U.S. states and territories. Established in 1971, the organization manages projects relating to family planning and reproductive health. In 1986 the organization began a worldwide response to HIV/AIDS. FHI 360's research and programs also address malaria, tuberculosis, and other infectious and chronic diseases and international agencies, governments, foundations, research institutions, and individual donors.



History
Other major sponsors of HIV/AIDS programs, as well as other health and development areas, include the United Kingdom's Department for International Development (DFID), the Bill and Melinda Gates Foundation and the Global Fund to Fight AIDS, Tuberculosis and Malaria. Other governments, private foundations, and the private sector have partnered with FHI 360 to overcome health and development challenges.

In 2010, Family Health International rebranded itself with a new tagline, "The science of improving lives". The name was simplified to FHI, reflecting a broadened scope that encompasses health and development as well as service to families, communities, and nations.

In 2011, Family Health International and Academy for Educational Development came together to create FHI 360. Staff includes experts in health, education, nutrition, environment, economic development, civil society, gender equality, youth, research and technology. FHI 360 operates in more than 70 countries and all U.S. states and territories.

Innovations

CAPRISA 004

FHI 360 contributed to a clinical trial called CAPRISA 004, which provided an important breakthrough in the fight against HIV and genital herpes with a vaginal gel that significantly reduces a woman's risk of infection.

Affiliations

CSIS Commission on Smart Global Health Policy
Family Health International's President for Public Health Programs, Peter Lamptey, was named a member of the CSIS Commission on Smart Global Health Policy in 2009. The Commission brings together 26 prominent leaders from the private sector, the United States Congress, academia, media, and the security, foreign policy, and global health communities to set goals and priorities for US global health efforts.

The Commission released its final report titled "A Healthier, Safer, and More Prosperous World" in March 2010.

Projects in countries around the world

In Vietnam 

 Initiative in Vietnam to reduce cigarette smoking (Initiative Click No-smoking, Vietnamese: Click không thuốc lá). It was initiated and implemented by Family Health International in cooperation with Vietnam Youth Union (Communist Party of Vietnam) and Vietnam National Committee on Smoking and Health (VINACOSH) on website https://clickkhongthuocla.vn 
 The Sustainable HIV Response From Technical Assistance (SHIFT) Project worth 26 million dollars

References

External links
FHI 360 official website 
Click không thuốc lá event website

Non-profit organizations based in North Carolina
Organizations based in Durham, North Carolina
Public health organizations
International medical and health organizations
Health charities in the United States